The twenty euro note (€20) is the third-lowest value euro banknote and has been used since the introduction of the euro (in its cash form) in 2002. 
The note is used by the 25 countries and a population of 343 million as their sole currency, with 23 legally adopting it. In December 2022, there were approximately 4,805,000,000 twenty euro banknotes in circulation around the eurozone. It is the second most widely circulated denomination, accounting for 16.3% of the total banknotes. Estimates suggest that the average life of a twenty euro banknote is about two years before it is replaced due to wear.

It is the third-smallest note, measuring 133 x 72 mm with a blue colour scheme. The twenty euro banknotes depict bridges and arches/doorways in Gothic architecture (between the 13th and 14th century CE). The twenty euro note contains several complex security features such as watermarks, invisible ink, holograms and microprinting that document its authenticity.

The full design of the Europa series 20 euro banknote was revealed on 24 February 2015 and launched on 25 November 2015.

History 

The euro was founded on 1 January 1999, when it became the currency of over 300 million people in Europe. For the first three years of its existence it was an invisible currency, only used in accountancy. Euro cash was not introduced until 1 January 2002, when it replaced the national banknotes and coins of the countries in eurozone 12, such as the Belgian franc and the Greek drachma.

Slovenia joined the Eurozone in 2007, Cyprus and Malta in 2008, Slovakia in 2009, Estonia in 2011, Latvia in 2014, and Lithuania in 2015.

The changeover period 
The changeover period during which the former currencies' notes and coins were exchanged for those of the euro lasted about two months, going from 1 January 2002 until 28 February 2002. The official date on which the national currencies ceased to be legal tender varied from member state to member state. The earliest date was in Germany, where the mark officially ceased to be legal tender on 31 December 2001, though the exchange period lasted for two months more. Even after the old currencies ceased to be legal tender, they continued to be accepted by national central banks for periods ranging from ten years to forever.

Changes 
Notes printed before November 2003 bear the signature of the first president of the European Central Bank, Wim Duisenberg, who was replaced on 1 November 2003 by Jean-Claude Trichet, whose signature appears on issues from November 2003 to March 2012. Notes issued after March 2012 bear the signature of the third president of the European Central Bank, incumbent Mario Draghi.

Until now there has been only one complete series of euro notes; however a new series, similar to the current one, is being released. The European Central Bank will, in due time, announce when banknotes from the first series lose legal tender status.

As of June 2012, current issues do not reflect the expansion of the European Union to 27 member states as Cyprus is not depicted on current notes as the map does not extend far enough east and Malta is also missing as it does not meet the current series' minimum size for depiction. Since the European Central Bank plans to redesign the notes every seven or eight years after each issue, a second series of banknotes is already in preparation. New production and anti-counterfeiting techniques will be employed on the new notes, but the design will be of the same theme and colours identical of the current series; bridges and arches. However, they would still be recognisable as a new series.

Design

The twenty euro note is the third smallest euro note at  ×  with a blue colour scheme. All bank notes depict bridges and arches/doorways in a different historical European style; the twenty euro note shows the gothic era (between the 13th and 14th century CE). Although Robert Kalina's original designs were intended to show real monuments, for political reasons the bridge and art are merely hypothetical examples of the architectural era.

Like all euro notes, it contains the denomination, the EU flag, the signature of the president of the ECB and the initials of said bank in different EU languages, a depiction of EU territories overseas, the stars from the EU flag and thirteen security features as listed below.

The ECB released a game on 5 February 2015 to discover some of the new security features embedded in the new €20 note. The most significant new anti-counterfeit measure is a transparent window, containing a hologram which shows a portrait of Europa and the number 20. The Europa series design of the 20 euro note was officially revealed on 24 February 2015.

Security features (first series)

As a lower value note, the security features of the twenty euro note are not as high as the other denominations; however, it is protected by: 
 A hologram, tilt the note and one should see the hologram image change between the value and a window or doorway, but in the background, one should see rainbow-coloured concentric circles of micro-letters moving from the centre to the edges of the patch.
 The EURion constellation.
 A special printing processes give the euro notes their unique feel.
 A glossy stripe, tilt the note and a glossy stripe showing the value numeral and the euro symbol will appear.
 Watermarks, it appears when the banknote is against the light.
 Raised printing, special methods of printing makes the ink feel raised or thicker in the main image, the lettering and the value numerals on the front of the banknotes. To feel the raised print, run your finger over it or scratch it gently with your fingernail.
 Ultraviolet ink, Under ultraviolet light, the paper itself should not glow, fibres embedded in the paper should appear, and should be coloured red, blue and green, the European Union flag looks green and has orange stars, the ECB President signature turns green, the large stars and small circles on the front glow and the European map, a bridge and the value numeral on the back appear in yellow.
 Microprinting, On numerous areas of the banknotes you can see microprinting, for example, inside the "ΕΥΡΩ" (EURO in Greek characters) on the front. You will need a magnifying glass to see it. The tiny text is sharp, and not blurred.
 A security thread, The security thread is embedded in the banknote paper. Hold the banknote against the light – the thread will appear as a dark stripe. The word "EURO" and the value can be seen in tiny letters on the stripe.
 Perforations, Hold the banknote against the light. You should see perforations in the hologram which will form the € symbol. You should also see small numbers showing the value.
 A matted surface, the note paper is made out of pure cotton, which feels crisp and firm, but not limp or waxy.
 Barcodes.
 A serial number.

Security features (Europa series) 
 Watermark: When the note is held under a normal light source, a portrait of Europa and an electrotype denomination appear on either side.
 Portrait Window: When the note is held against the light, the window in the hologram becomes transparent and reveals a portrait of Europa, which is visible on both sides of the note.
 Portrait Hologram: When the note is tilted, the hologram – the silver-coloured stripe on the right of the note – reveals a portrait of Europa as well as the "€" symbol, the main image and the value of the banknote.
 Emerald Number: When the note is tilted, the number "20" on the bottom left corner of the note displays an effect of the light that moves up and down. The number "20" also changes colour from emerald green to deep blue.
 Security Thread: When the note is held to the light, the security thread appears as a dark line. The "€" symbol and the value of the note can be seen in tiny white lettering in the stripe.
 Microprinting: Some areas of the banknote feature a series of tiny letters. The microprinting can be read with a magnifying glass. The letters are sharp, not blurred.

Circulation 

The European Central Bank is closely monitoring the circulation and stock of the euro coins and banknotes. It is a task of the Eurosystem to ensure an efficient and smooth supply of euro notes and to maintain their integrity throughout the euro area.

In December 2022, there were  €20 banknotes in circulation around the Eurozone. for €.

This is a net number, i.e. the number of banknotes issued by the Eurosystem central banks, without further distinction as to who is holding the currency issued, thus also including the stocks held by credit institutions.

Besides the date of the introduction of the first set to January 2002, the publication of figures is more significant through the maximum number of banknotes raised each year. The number is higher the end of the year.

The figures are as follows (3 Nov 2017) :

In November 2015, a new 'Europe' series was issued.

The first series of notes were issued in conjunction with those for a few weeks in the series 'Europe' until existing stocks are exhausted, then gradually withdrawn from circulation. Both series thus run parallel but the proportion tends inevitably to a sharp decrease in the first series.

The latest figures provided by the ECB are the following :

Legal information 
Legally, both the European Central Bank and the central banks of the eurozone countries have the right to issue the seven different euro banknotes. In practice, only the national central banks of the zone physically issue and withdraw euro banknotes. The European Central Bank does not have a cash office and is not involved in any cash operations.

Tracking 
There are several communities of people at European level, most of which is EuroBillTracker, that, as a hobby, it keeps track of the euro banknotes that pass through their hands, to keep track and know where they travel or have travelled. The aim is to record as many notes as possible to know details about its spread, like from where and to where they travel in general, follow it up, like where a ticket has been seen in particular, and generate statistics and rankings, for example, in which countries there are more tickets. EuroBillTracker has registered over 155 million notes as of May 2016, worth more than €2.897 billion.

References

External links 
 

Euro banknotes
Twenty-base-unit banknotes